"Flowers in December" is a song by American alternative rock band Mazzy Star, released in October 1996 as the lead single from their third studio album Among My Swan. It was written by Hope Sandoval and David Roback, and produced by Roback. "Flowers in December" reached  40 on the UK Singles Chart and remained in the top 100 for two weeks. A music video was filmed to promote the single, directed by Kevin Kerslake.

Critical reception
Upon the song's release, Music & Media named "Flowers in December" their "single of the week" during November 1996. They commented: "David Roback and Hope Sandoval's dreamy acoustics have become even more poppier with gorgeous melodies, plenty of minor chord changes and a delicate violin whispering in the background."

In a review of Among My Swan, Chris Molanphy of CMJ New Music Monthly commented: "...amid Hope Sandoval's wispy voice and David Roback's plinking guitars, there's a brightness trying to emerge. You hear it in the chimes that ring over "Disappear," and in Sandoval's wistful harmonica on "Flowers in December." In a 2013 retrospective on the band's career, Emily Mackay of New Musical Express considered the song "lovely but not the album's best moment".

Track listings
7-inch single and CD1 (UK)
 "Flowers in December" – 4:56
 "Tell Your Honey" – 4:31
 "Hair and Skin" – 3:42

CD2 (UK)
 "Flowers in December" – 4:56
 "Ride It On" (live) – 3:09
 "Had a Thought" – 2:24

CD single (Netherlands)
 "Flowers in December" – 4:56
 "Tell Your Honey" – 4:31
 "Hair and Skin" – 3:42
 "Ride It On" (live) – 3:09

Personnel
Mazzy Star
 Hope Sandoval – vocals, harmonica, co-production
 David Roback – guitar, production, engineering
 William Cooper – strings, engineering
 Jill Emery – bass
 Keith Mitchell – drums

Additional personnel
 Dale Everingham – engineering
 Eddy Schreyer – mastering
 Andy Caitlan, John Eagle – sleeve photography

Charts

References

1996 songs
1996 singles
Capitol Records singles
Mazzy Star songs